The New Caledonia women's national rugby sevens team is New Caledonia's national representative in rugby sevens.

Current squad

Previous squads

 Shirley Benemie
 Djesy Gaia
 Lydie Wamejo
 Manon Boudet
 Theresa Boulouguen
 Louise Waiane
 Vanessa Beaudouin
 Claire Hillaireau
 Yolaine Yengo
 Marie Hélène Wahnawe
 Anne-Marie Waitreu
 Marie Aymeric

 Djemila Ihmanang
 Anne-Marie Waitreu
 Elisabete Keletaona
 Claire Hillaireau
 Marie-Helene Wahnawe
 Catherine Devillers
 Brenda Siwoine
 Yolaine Yengo
 Bianca Nekotrotro
 Wendy Mayat
 Dorothee Pakaina
 Victoire Homou

Tournament History

Pacific Games

See also
Rugby union in New Caledonia

References

Women's national rugby sevens teams

Sport in New Caledonia
R